Ebu is an album by American jazz saxophonist Hamiet Bluiett recorded in 1984 and released on the Italian Soul Note label.

Reception

In his review for AllMusic, Chris Kelsey states "Though Ebu has a taste of the arcane, it is mostly a collection of relatively straightahead Bluiett-penned blowing vehicles done with fire and invention. Bluiett has the biggest sound in town; his phrasing and articulation is a little heavy, as one would expect, but he plays with a strength and conviction that's rarely equalled by other baritonists... This music has a manifest unruliness, a spirit of adventure; it leaps outrageously into the unknown and usually lands square on its feet."

Track listing
All compositions by Hamiet Bluiett except as indicated
 "Ebu" – 8:30
 "New Bones" – 9:05
 "Nu Tune" – 3:30
 "Gumbo (Vegetarian Style)" – 8:02
 "Things Will Never Be the Same" – 7:40
 "A Night in Tunisia" (Dizzy Gillespie, Frank Paparelli) – 7:17

Personnel
Hamiet Bluiett – baritone saxophone, alto clarinet
John Hicks – piano
Fred Hopkins – bass
Marvin "Smitty" Smith – drums

References

1984 albums
Hamiet Bluiett albums
Black Saint/Soul Note albums